Spartan Records was founded by John T. Frazier in Seattle, Washington in January 2007. It is currently home to the bands Schematic, Barren Womb, Ourlives, Shy, Low, and several others. Prior to founding Spartan, Frazier was the director of marketing at several preeminent independent record labels including Tooth and Nail Records, Solid State Records, and Drive-Thru Records. The label has been a full-time operation since January 2013. Spartan Records is known for its creative pressing of colored vinyl variants.

Background

Formation 
John T. Frazier has stated that Spartan Records got its inspirations from the mail-order record labels he bought from while growing up. He worked in college radio and received an internship at the major record label Geffen Records and worked as part of the street teams for several other labels. He started his career working for a small indie label called crank!. After working with several other labels including Tooth and Nail Records, Solid State Records and Drive-Thru Records, he founded Spartan Records in 2007; eventually leaving Tooth and Nail Records in December 2012 to work exclusively with Spartan Records.

Destination: Beautiful 

The most successful release by Spartan Records has been their pressing of Mae's Destination: Beautiful. Their first pressing in 2012 involved a mix of 500 vinyl LPs including 200 white, 200 navy blue/white swirl, and 100 180 gsm black discs. After completely selling out the first pressing in 2012 they announced another pressing of 500 in 2013 on teal (100), white teal splatter (200) and Teal/white Swirl (200) these also sold out. Due to the popularity of this pressing they released another pressing of 500 copies on glow in the dark vinyl through Hot Topic and that pressing sold out quickly as well. In 2014 a fourth pressing of Destination: Beautiful was released as a part of Record Sale Day 2014 on Transparent Blue and gold vinyl. It was limited to 500 copies and has sold out as well.

As a result of continued popularity of each successive pressing Spartan Records announced mae week. The week of May 19, 2014 spartan records announced that a fifth pressing of 500 vinyl copies would be sold 100 per day on 5 different variants. In addition to the daily release 25 sets of all five variants sold out on the first day. Over the course of the week 100 Gold/White Swirl with Silver Splatter on the first day, 100 gold sold out on the second day, 100 blue white and clear LPs sold out on the third day, 100 copies on Milky Clear with White Splatter sold out on the fourth day and 100 White / Aqua Blue / Double mint Tri-Color discs sold out the fifth day. In total all 500 in the fifth pressing sold out during the course of mae week. In addition re release of a style of mae shirt was sold as an extra to the vinyl. A sixth pressing of the vinyl is currently for sale on the Spartan Records website.

Additional mae records have been sold through Spartan Records such as The Everglow, the (m)(a)(e) anthology and most recently Our Love is a Painted Picture.

Releases

Artists
This is a partial list of artists who currently, or have previously recorded for Spartan Records.
 American Opera
 Anchor & Braille
 Assertion
 Barren Womb
 Daisyhead
 Dearist
 Demons
 Fallow Land
 Florida Man
 Giants Chair
 Hidden Hospitals
 Honey and Salt
 Kiska
 Lights & Motion
 Lucky Scars
 Mae
 Man Mountain
 Mountain Time
 My God, It's Full of Stars
 NYVES
 Over the Ocean
 Ourlives
 Reader
 Renaissance Fair
 Schematic
 Secret Stuff
 Sense Field
 Shy, Low
 Sky's the Limit
 Square Peg Round Hole
 States
 Subways on the Sun
 Sullivan
 Sundressed
 Surprises
 The Darling Fire
 The Farewell Bend
 The Foxery
 Trace Bundy
 Trespassers
 Unifier
 Unwed Sailor
 VAR
 Waypoint
 Young Fox

See also
Dave Elkins
List of record labels

References

External links
 Official website
 

2007 establishments in Washington (state)
Alternative rock record labels
American companies established in 2008
American independent record labels
Companies based in Seattle
Hardcore record labels
Post-hardcore record labels
Record labels established in 2007
Rock record labels